Secret Agent X-9 is a 1945 Universal movie serial based on the comic strip Secret Agent X-9. It was the second serial with this name, the first was released by Universal in 1937.

Plot
On a neutral island in the Pacific called Shadow Island (above the island of Formosa), run by American gangster Lucky Kamber, both sides in World War II attempt to control the secret of element 722, which can be used to create synthetic aviation fuel.

Cast
 Lloyd Bridges as Phil Corrigan aka Secret Agent X-9
 Keye Luke as Ah Fong, Chinese agent
 Jan Wiley as Lynn Moore, Australian agent
 Victoria Horne as Nabura, villainous Japanese agent
 Samuel S. Hinds as Solo
 Cy Kendall as Lucky Kamber, self-proclaimed governor of the neutral Shadow Island
 Jack Overman as Marker
 George Lynn as Bach, one of Nabura's henchmen
 Clarence Lung as Takahari, one of Nabura's henchmen
 Benson Fong as Dr. Hakahima
 Arno Frey as Kapitan Grut, Nazi captain
 Ferdinand Munier as Papa Pierre Dupray
 Ann Codee as "Mama Pierre" Dupray
 Edward Howard as Drag Dorgan

Production
Secret Agent X-9 is based on the comic strip Secret Agent X-9 by  Dashiell Hammett, Leslie Charteris and others. It was Universal's last comic strip adaptation (from 1936 to 1945, Universal made almost as many serial adaptations of comic strips as both of their rivals, Columbia and Republic, combined). The serial reuses footage and Frank Skinner's score from Universal's Gung Ho! (1943).

Stunts
 Eddie Parker doubling Lloyd Bridges
 John Daheim doubling Benson Fong

Chapter titles
 Torpedo Rendezvous
 Ringed by Fire (or "The Flaming Lake" per the on screen teaser card)
 Death Curve
 Floodlight Murder
 Doom Downgrade
 Strafed by a Zero
 High Pressure Deadline
 The Dropping Floor
 The Danger Point
 Japanese Burial
 Fireworks for Deadmen
 Big Gun Fusillade
 Zero Minute
Source:

References

External links
 
 
 

1945 films
American black-and-white films
1940s English-language films
Seafaring films
American spy films
Universal Pictures film serials
American World War II films
Films based on comic strips
Films based on works by Alex Raymond
Films directed by Ray Taylor
Films directed by Lewis D. Collins
World War II films made in wartime
Films based on works by Dashiell Hammett
American action adventure films
1940s action adventure films
Films scored by Paul Sawtell